Isaac Schultz (born March 11, 1991) is an American politician serving in the Minnesota House of Representatives since 2023. A member of the Republican Party of Minnesota, Schultz represents District 10B in central Minnesota, which includes the cities of Milaca and Foley, Watab Township, and parts of Benton, Isanti, Kanabec, Mille Lacs, and Morrison Counties.

Early life, career and education 
Schultz grew up on a farm near Upsala, Minnesota and attended college at the University of Northwestern – St. Paul, earning a bachelor's degree in marketing.

Schultz completed an internship in the Minnesota Senate, and worked as a legislative assistant to former Speaker of the Minnesota House Kurt Daudt from 2014 to 2019. Prior to his election to the House, Schultz worked as district director for U.S. Representative Pete Stauber.

Minnesota House of Representatives 
Schultz was first elected to the Minnesota House of Representatives in 2022, after redistricting and the retirement of Republican incumbent Sondra Erickson. Schultz serves as an assistant minority leader and sits on the Environment and Natural Resources Finance and Policy, Labor and Industry Finance and Policy, and Sustainable Infrastructure Committees.

Electoral history

Personal life 
Schultz lives in Elmdale Township, Minnesota with his spouse.

References

External links 

Members of the Minnesota House of Representatives
1991 births
Living people